Lycée Jean-de-La-Fontaine is a lycée in the 16th arrondissement of Paris, France.

The school building, in the shape of an "open rectangle", was constructed on top of ancient fortifications. Construction began in 1935 and finished in 1938. Towards the end of World War II it was used as an American hospital.

External links 

 Lycée La Fontaine 

Educational institutions established in 1938
La Fontaine
1938 establishments in France